Steve Biko (1946–1977) was a South African anti-Apartheid political activist.

Steve Biko is also the name of:

 Steve Biko FC, Bakau, Gambia; a soccer team
 Steve Biko Academic Hospital, Pretoria, South Africa
 Steve Biko Building, University of Manchester Students' Union, University of Manchester, Manchester, England, UK
 Steve Biko Foundation, a South African community development organization
 Steve Biko Artillery Regiment, South African Artillery, South Africa

See also

 The Annual Steve Biko Memorial Lecture
 
 Steve (disambiguation)
 Biko (disambiguation)